Pedro Orfila Artime (born 6 March 1988) is a Spanish footballer who plays as a right-back or a central defender for Real Avilés CF.

Club career

Sporting Gijón
Born in Luanco, Asturias, Orfila joined Sporting de Gijón's academy at the age of 13. He spent the better part of his first four seasons as a senior with their reserves, in the Segunda División B.

Orfila made his competitive debut for the first team on 27 October 2010, playing the entire 3–1 away loss against RCD Mallorca in the round of 32 of the Copa del Rey. His La Liga bow only arrived on 19 February 2012, in a 1–1 home draw with Atlético Madrid where he excelled at right-back.

During his spell at the El Molinón, Orfila made 23 official appearances.

Racing Santander
For the 2013–14 campaign, Orfila was loaned to third-tier club Racing de Santander. In July 2014, after winning promotion to the Segunda División, he signed a permanent two-year contract as a free agent.

Orfila only missed three matches in 42 in 2014–15, but the Cantabrians were immediately relegated.

Later career
Orfila subsequently competed in divisions two and three, representing CD Numancia, Real Murcia, FC Cartagena and CD Atlético Baleares. On 16 December 2021, he scored twice as the latter side defeated top-flight Getafe CF 5–0 in the domestic cup; the opposition played more than one hour with one man less after Erick Cabaco was sent off for headbutting Isi Ros.

References

External links

1988 births
Living people
Spanish footballers
Footballers from Asturias
Association football defenders
La Liga players
Segunda División players
Segunda División B players
Primera Federación players
Segunda Federación players
Real Avilés CF footballers
Sporting de Gijón B players
Sporting de Gijón players
Racing de Santander players
CD Numancia players
Real Murcia players
FC Cartagena footballers
CD Atlético Baleares footballers